Myronenko, Mironenko, or Mironienka is a gender-neutral East Slavic surname. It may refer to:
 Alexander Mironenko (1959–1980), Soviet soldier
 Andriy Myronenko (born 1994), Ukrainian basketball player
 Dmytro Myronenko (born 1996), Ukrainian footballer
 Irina Mironenko, Soviet pair skater
 Vitaliy Mironenko (born 1985), Kazakhstani volleyball player
 Vladimir Mironenko (born 1942), Belarusian mathematician
 Mironenko reflecting function

See also
 
 

Ukrainian-language surnames